The 2020–21 NCAA Division I women's ice hockey season began in November 2020 and ended with the 2021 NCAA National Collegiate Women's Ice Hockey Tournament's championship game at Erie Insurance Arena in Erie, Pennsylvania on March 20, 2021.

Polls

Regular season

Standings

Player stats

Scoring leaders
The following players lead the NCAA in points at the conclusion of games played on March 20, 2021.

Leading goaltenders
The following goaltenders lead the NCAA in goals against average.

GP = Games played; Min = Minutes played; W = Wins; L = Losses; T = Ties; GA = Goals against; SO = Shutouts; SV% = Save percentage; GAA = Goals against average

NCAA tournament

Note: * denotes overtime period(s)

Awards

WCHA

CHA

WHEA

ECAC

Patty Kazmaier Award

AHCA Coach of the year

All-America teams

All-USCHO.com teams

HCA Awards
Aerin Frankel, Hockey Commissioners Association Women's Goalie of the Year 2021

November
 Gaby Roy, Boston College, Hockey Commissioners Association Women's Player of the Month (November 2020) 
Lauren Bench, Minnesota, Hockey Commissioners Association Women's Goaltender of the Month (November 2020)

December

January
Aerin Frankel, WHCA National Goaltender of the Month, January 2021

February
Aerin Frankel, Northeastern, WHCA National Goaltender of the Month, February 2021 
Alina Mueller, Northeastern, Hockey Commissioners Association Women's Player of the Month (February 2021) 
Lacey Eden, Wisconsin, Hockey Commissioners Association Women's Rookie of the Month (February 2021)

March
Daryl Watts, Wisconsin, Hockey Commissioners Association Women's Player of the Month (March 2021):
Makenna Webster, Wisconsin, Hockey Commissioners Association Women's Rookie of the Month (March 2021)
Aerin Frankel, Northeastern, Hockey Commissioners Association Women's Goaltender of the Month (March 2021)

References

2020–21 NCAA Division I women's hockey season
NCAA
NCAA Division I women's ice hockey seasons